Isabelle Muller-Quoy is a French politician who represented La République En Marche! in the French National Assembly from June to November 2017, representing Val-d'Oise's 1st constituency. Her election was invalidated on 16 November 2017 after it was determined that her substitute, Michel Alexeef, was ineligible as a result of his having served as a president of an employment tribunal within the constituency, disqualifying him under the electoral code. A by-election for the constituency was subsequently held in 2018, in which she was defeated in the second round, receiving 48.55% of the vote against Antoine Savignat, candidate of The Republicans (LR).

References

Year of birth missing (living people)
Living people
Deputies of the 15th National Assembly of the French Fifth Republic
La République En Marche! politicians
21st-century French women politicians
Place of birth missing (living people)
Women members of the National Assembly (France)
Members of Parliament for Val-d'Oise